The Gerromorpha comprise an infraorder of insects in the "true bug" order Hemiptera. These "typical" bugs (suborder Heteroptera) are commonly called semiaquatic bugs or shore-inhabiting bugs. The Ochteroidea (infraorder Nepomorpha are also found in shore habitat, while the Gerromorpha are actually most often encountered running around on the water surface, being kept from sinking by surface tension and their water-repellent legs. Well-known members of the Gerromorpha are the namesake Gerridae (water striders).

Systematics
The eight family families usually recognized are arranged in four superfamilies. The two small or monotypic ones of these are basal lineages; the two larger ones form a more advanced clade. The phylogenetic sequence of superfamilies and families of the Gerromorpha is:
 Mesovelioidea – water treaders
 Madeoveliidae (sometimes included in Mesoveliidae)
 Mesoveliidae
 Hebroidea – velvet bugs
 Hebridae (Hyrcaninae might arguably be considered a good family as the superfamily is monotypic otherwise.)
 Hydrometroidea
 Paraphrynoveliidae
 Hydrometridae – water measurers
 Macroveliidae
 Gerroidea
 Hermatobatidae
 Gerridae – water striders
 Veliidae – riffle bugs

References

Further reading
 Tree of Life Web Project (ToL) (1995): Gerromorpha. Water striders, water measurers, velvet water bugs, and water treaders. Version of 1995-JAN-01. Retrieved 2008-JUL-28.
 Tree of Life Web Project (ToL) (2005): Heteroptera. True bugs. Version of 2005-JAN-01. Retrieved 2008-JUL-28.

 
Heteroptera